Graphis mucronata is a graphid lichen found in Australia. It is in the family Graphidaceae.

References

mucronata
Taxa named by James Stirton